John Edwin Charlesworth (14 September 1895 – 15 February 1960) was an Australian rules footballer who played in Tasmania during the 1910s and 1920s and also represented the state in interstate matches. He was inducted into the Tasmanian Football Hall of Fame in 2005.

Charlesworth played for Cananore in the Tasmanian Football League (TFL).

See also
 1927 Melbourne Carnival

Footnotes

References
 O'Neill, P., "Great Follower and Star Centre: Jack Charlesworth", The Sporting Globe, (Wednesday, 14 June 1939), p.11.

1895 births
1960 deaths
Cananore Football Club players
Australian rules footballers from Tasmania
Tasmanian Football Hall of Fame inductees